Saturns Pattern is the twelfth solo album by English singer-songwriter and musician Paul Weller, released on 18 May 2015. The album reached number two on the UK Albums Chart.

Track listing
All tracks composed by Paul Weller and Jan Stan Kybert; except where indicated

Personnel
 Paul Weller - Vocals (1,2,3,4,5,6,7,8,9), Acoustic Guitar (3,6,7,8), Electric Guitars (1,2,3,4,6,8), Guitars (5,9), Bass (1,5,6,7,8,9), Piano (2,3,6,7,8), Hammond Organ (1,8), Rhodes (7), Mellotron (9), Philicorda (7), Keyboards (5,6), Synths (4), Moog (3), Harmonica (2), Percussion (2), Hand Claps (3), Finger Snaps (3), Strings (9), Backing Vocals (1,3,5,6,7)
 The Amorphous Androgynous - Programming and Psychedelicization of Synths, Tape Loops, Drums, Harp, Strings, Guitar (1)
 Syd Arthur - Backing Vocals (5)
 Steve Brookes - Electric Guitar (9), Slide Guitar (8)
 Raven Bush - Violin (9)
 Steve Cradock - Electric Guitar (7), Guitars (5,9), Moog (9)
 Andy Crofts - Electric Guitar (1), Bass (3), Piano (3), Mellotron (2), Keyboards (5,8,9), Keys (2), Moog (2), Backing Vocals (1,3,5,6,7,8,9)
 Ben Gordelier - Drums (1,2,3,5,6,7,8,9), Percussion (3,7,8)
 Jan Stan Kybert - Electric Guitar (6), Bass (2), Keyboards (5,6), Moog (9), Programming (2,6)
 Josh McClorey - Slide Guitar (4)
 Steve Pilgrim - Backing Vocals (2)
 Charles Rees - Bass (4), Egg Whisk (4)
 Stuart Rowe - Electric Guitar (1)
 Tom Van Heel - Drums (4)
 Hannah Weller - Backing Vocals (1,5,7)
 Bill Wheeler - Guitar (4)

Charts

See also
 Saturn's hexagon

References

2015 albums
Paul Weller albums
Parlophone albums
Warner Records albums